Mount Rukhin is a small mountain, 1,740 m, standing 9 nautical miles (17 km) southwest of Ekho Mountain in the Lomonosov Mountains, Queen Maud Land. Mapped from air photos by Norwegian Antarctic Expedition, 1958–59; remapped by Soviet Antarctic Expedition, 1960–61, and named after L.B. Rukhin, professor at Leningrad State University, who died in 1959.
 

Mountains of Queen Maud Land
Princess Astrid Coast